The Spartan League was a football league in England covering London and adjacent counties. Established in 1907, it merged with the South Midlands League in 1997 to form the Spartan South Midlands League.

History
The Spartan League was established in 1907 with six clubs; Bromley, Dulwich Hamlet, Leytonstone, Nunhead, Shepherd's Bush and West Norwood. It gained five clubs for its second season, and split into two divisions, Eastern and Western. In 1909–10 the split was changed to Section A and B, before the league reverted to a single division in 1910–11.

The league added a second division in 1920, and in 1925 it added another division, with Division Two divided into 2A and 2B. This structure lasted until 1928 when the league gained another division, with both Division One and Two divided into East and West divisions. The following season the league was reorganised, with a Premier Division created above Division One and Division Two still divided into East and West sections. This structure remained unchanged until World War II. The league restarted in 1945 and was divided into three divisions; Central, Eastern and Western. The following season it reverted to a single division.

In 1975 the league merged with the Metropolitan–London League, forming the London Spartan League, which ran with two divisions; Division One and Division Two. In 1977 they were renamed, becoming the Premier Division and Senior Division. The league readopted the name Spartan League in 1987, A third division, the Intermediate Division, was added for the 1987–88 season; by 1992 it had been renamed Division Two.

In 1997 it merged with the South Midlands League to form the Spartan South Midlands League. The new league initially ran with two Premier Divisions (north and south), a Senior Division and two Division Ones (north and south).

Champions

Spartan League
First season with six clubs.

For the 1908–09 season, the league was split into two regional sections: Eastern and Western Sections.

For the following season, the regional divisions were renamed the Section B and fSection A respectively.

For the 1910–11 season, the league reverted to a single division

For the 1920–21 season, Division Two was added.

For the 1925–26 season, Division Two was divided in Division Two A and Division Two B

For the 1928–29 season, both Division One and Two divided into East and West divisions.

For the following season the league was reorganised, with a Premier Division created above Division One and Division Two still divided into East and West sections.

In the 1945–46 season the league had three divisions.

For the 1946–47 season, the league reverted to a single division.

In 1975 the Spartan League merged with the Metropolitan-London League to form the London Spartan League.

London Spartan League
For the 1975–76 season, the London Spartan League  ran with two divisions; Division One and Division Two.For the 1977–78 season, the Division One and Division Two were renamed as Premier Division and Senior Division respectively.In 1987 the London Spartan League readopted the name to Spartan LeagueSpartan League For the 1987–88 season, the league added an Intermediate Division.For the 1991–92 season, the Intermediate Division was renamed as Division Two.In 1997 the Spartan League merged with the South Midlands League to form the Spartan South Midlands League.''

References

 
Defunct football leagues in England
Football competitions in London
1907 establishments in England
1997 establishments in England